Charles Elisabeth Conrard, 2nd Duke d'Ursel and of Hoboken, Prince of Arches and Charleville and Count of Grobbendoncq (1717–1775) was a Belgian Duke. He succeeded his father and became the second Duke of Ursel in 1738.

He was the First Prince of Arche and Charleville of the Ursel Branche, titles inherited by his mother Princess zu Salm. He made career at the imperial court in Vienna, was Imperial Lord Chamberlain and Field Marshall. He was made knight of the Golden Fleece in 1771.

Hingene 
Charles was of importance for the familial patrimony: he decides to engage Giovanni Niccolò Servandoni to redesign the Castle of Hingene both the interior and exterior are restyled. Servadoni designs great plans to reshape the whole castle and garden, however the duke refuses. The current facade of the castle still has the classical impression of this era.

Family 
He was the son of Conrad-Albert, 1st Duke d'Ursel (1665–1738), and Elisabeth Eleonora of Salm. He married in Vienna to the eldest daughter of Georg Christian, Fürst von Lobkowitz and Henriette von Waldstein-Wartenburg (1702 - 1780). Through this line the family descends of Ferdinand I, Holy Roman Emperor. His sister was married to the Duke of Bournonville. He became brother in law of the bishop of Ghent Ferdinand-Marie de Lobkowitz.

Children 
 Ferdinand-Marie d'Ursel
 Emanuel Maximilian d'Ursel
 Wolfgang Guillaume Joseph Léonard Vital, 3rd Duke of Ursel: Married Flore von Arenberg
 Charlotte Philippine Elisabeth Eleonore d'Ursel, married Freiherr von Stein
 Marie Henriette Christine Leonarde d'Ursel, married Joseph, Count de Ferraris.
 Maria Anne d'Ursel 

After his death he was succeeded by his son Wolfgang, who became 3rd Duke of Ursel.

Ancestry

References

Duke d'Ursel
Knights of the Golden Fleece